Mzamiru Yassin (born 3 January 1996) is a Tanzanian football player who plays as midfielder for Simba SC and the Tanzania national team.

International career
Yassin debuted with the Tanzania national team in a friendly 3-0 loss to Zimbabwe on 13 November 2016.

References

External links
 
 NFT Profile
 Simba SC Profile

1996 births
Living people
People from Morogoro Region
Tanzanian footballers
Tanzania international footballers
Association football midfielders
Mtibwa Sugar F.C. players
Simba S.C. players
Tanzanian Premier League players